The 1951 British Grand Prix was a Formula One motor race held on 14 July 1951 at the Silverstone Circuit in Northamptonshire, England. It was race 5 of 8 in the 1951 World Championship of Drivers and was contested over 90 laps. The race was the first victory for José Froilán González, and was also the first of many for the Scuderia Ferrari team. Both the team and driver also achieved their first ever pole position during the weekend.

Report
José Froilán González was one second quicker than Juan Manuel Fangio in qualifying, achieving the first pole position of his career. It was also the first pole position for the Ferrari team, and the first in the World Championship (excluding the Indy 500 races) not scored by an Alfa Romeo. Nino Farina and Alberto Ascari qualified in third and fourth positions, completing the front row.

González and Fangio shot away almost parallel from the front row of the grid, closely followed by the other Alfa Romeos and Ferraris. Alfa Romeo driver Felice Bonetto, who started in seventh position, was the first man at the first corner, with the Ferrari of González in second position. González took the lead from Bonetto on the second lap with Fangio chasing. The BRM cars of Reg Parnell and Peter Walker were in hot pursuit of the leaders. The team had arrived at the last minute, and had not practiced or even qualified for their debut race, and had started in 19th and 20th positions. Bonetto's Alfa Romeo teammates of Fangio and reigning World Champion, Nino Farina, managed to overtake him to move into second and third places. On lap 6, Fangio began to close in on González; he passed him on the straight on lap 10, and slowly began to draw away. Consalvo Sanesi then pulled into the pits for fuel and new tyres.

The Maserati of John James became the first retirement of the race on lap 23 with a radiator problem, but was soon joined on the sidelines by Louis Chiron, both his Maserati teammates, the Ferrari of Alberto Ascari and Farina. Farina pulled up at Abbey curve after 75 laps with a slipping clutch and his engine on fire. He had set the lap record on lap 38, with a time of 1 minute 44 seconds, an average speed of 99.99 mph, ensuring he still left the weekend with one point. González retook the lead on lap 39 with an overtake at Becketts corner. He kept his lead for the remainder of the race (excluding one lap when he pitted just before Fangio did) extending it to 1 minute and 5 seconds with 5 laps to go, before easing off at the end of the race. The BRM drivers of Parnell and Walker were still battling on, despite the fact they were suffering from hand and feet burns, and would eventually finish fifth and seventh respectively.

The Alfa Romeos of Fangio and Farina pitted twice for fuel, owing to the awful fuel consumption of their cars. They were doing  miles to the gallon, and needed to take on 70 gallons for every stop.  Both drivers needed to stop twice, and, owing to the lengthy, minutes-long pit stops of Formula One in 1951, the more fuel efficient Ferrari of González (who only needed to make one stop) was able to overtake the Alfa Romeos and pull out a considerable lead.

González eventually took his own and Ferrari's first victory in a World Championship race by 51 seconds.  It was the first World Championship race (excluding the Indy 500) that was not won by an Alfa Romeo.  An Alfa Romeo was still in second place though, in the form of the year's eventual champion Fangio. Luigi Villoresi became the second Ferrari on the podium after he finished in third place, two laps behind. Bonetto and Parnell were the other two-point scorers at the race, finishing in fourth and fifth positions respectively.

As it turned out, González had actually raced with an older chassis and engine than his teammates, Villoresi and Ascari.

Entries

 – Maurice Trintignant, Robert Manzon, André Simon and Philippe Étancelin all withdrew from the event prior to practice.

Classification

Qualifying

Race

Notes
 – 1 point for fastest lap

Championship standings after the race 
Drivers' Championship standings

 Note: Only the top five positions are listed. Only the best 4 results counted towards the Championship.

References

British
British Grand Prix
British Grand Prix
British Grand Prix